HMS Aetna (or HMS Etna) was the mercantile Success launched in 1803 at Littlehampton. The Admiralty purchased here in 1803 to convert her to a Royal Navy bomb vessel. Aetna participated in the second Battle of Copenhagen in 1807 and the Battle of the Basque Roads in 1809.  Later, she participated in the attack on Fort McHenry in the Battle of Baltimore and the bombardment of Fort Washington, Maryland in 1814, during the War of 1812. The Navy sold her in 1816 and she returned to mercantile service under her original name. She sailed to Calcutta, to Rio de Janeiro, and more locally until she was wrecked in 1823.

Mercantile origins
Aetna was the merchant vessel Success, launched at Arundel, equally Littlehampton, at the mouth of the River Arun. She appeared in the Register of Shipping (RS) in the volume for 1804 with W.Birch, master, J. Coney, owner, and trade London. The Admiralty purchased Success in 1803.

Naval career
Aetna was commissioned in December 1803 under Commander George Cocks and first served in the Mediterranean. His replacement was Commander Richard Thomas.

In December 1805 she came under the command of Captain John Quillam and in February 1807 or so under Commander William Peake, still in the Mediterranean. She was recommissioned in June 1807 under Commander William Godfrey for the Baltic. There she took part in the siege and bombardment of Copenhagen between 15 August and 20 October 1807, resulting in the capture of Danish Fleet by Admiral Gambier.

Battle of the Basque Roads
On 6 April 1809, Aetna, eight fire ships, and a transport with Congreve rockets, joined Captain Lord Cochrane's fleet of frigates, sloops and gunbrigs off the Chasseron lighthouse where Cochrane was preparing to attack French warships in the Basque Roads.

Aetna was the only vessel of her class present. On the night of 11 April Aetna, the frigate  and the sloop  were stationed near the north-west of the Île-d'Aix while the fire ships were launched against the enemy. At 11:00 on the 13th Aetna, the gun-brigs and the rocket cutters moved up to the mouth of the Charante to fire on the French ships ,  and Indienne  which had been driven ashore. Aetna split her 13-inch mortar in the attack. At 16:00 the falling tide forced them to return to their former anchorage under fire from shore batteries. By the evening of the 14th she had fired away all her 10-inch shells, but she did not leave the mouth of the Charente until the 29th. In 1847 the Admiralty awarded the then still surviving participants in the battle the Naval General Service Medal (NGSM) with the clasp "Basque Roads 1809".

Walcheren Campaign
Aetna then formed part of the naval force in the Scheldt under the command of Sir Richard Strachan. At 06:00 on the morning of 28 July 1809 Aetna, together with the whole fleet in The Downs, set sail for Flushing and that evening they anchored about 18 miles from Walcheren. On the 30th they watched the troops go ashore covered by the frigates.

The following morning at 11:00 Aetna, with the rest of the force, opened fire with her two mortars for the first time and fired 42 shells before an officer in a boat came round the various ships about midnight to desire them to desist. Commander Paul Lawless assumed command of Aetna in August, though he may have already been in command before then.

On 2 August Aetna moved towards the fort at Rammekens and on the 5th she anchored about a mile and a half from Flushing. Aetna saw no more action until the 13th when she fired seventy-four 13-inch shells and thirty-nine 10-inch at Flushing before the tide turned. When they were able to close again another fifty-two 12-inch and nine 10-inch shells were discharged. HMS Vesuvius, several gunbrigs and man-of-war launches with 24-pounders were firing alongside them. There was more firing on the 14th and 15th before a white flag was seen and the town surrendered on the 17th. By the 18th Aetna was a little more than 12 miles from Antwerp and a number of officers went ashore for a walk on South Beveland. On the 22nd they dropped down to the town of Doel and fired thirty-five 13-inch and five 10-inch shells to deter the French from throwing up a battery. All this time Antwerp was only seven or eight miles away, but still the troops waited, suffering from miasmatic fever and dysentery. On the 29th Aetna fired fifteen large shells against the battery and Thunder, Hound and a brig threw their shells into the enemy troops on the opposite side of the Scheldt. The following day forty-one more shells were fired. During the first week in September South Beveland was evacuated and the fiasco of the Walcheren expedition drew to a close.

Cockburn in his dispatches after the campaign noted that "the constant and correct Fire from the Ætna, Captain Lawless, particularly drew my Attention." Commander John Bowker replaced Lawless and then sailed Aetna for Cadiz on 8 April 1810.

Defence of Cadiz
Aetna was subsequently employed in the defence of Cádiz. On 23 November Aetna,  and Thunder, with a division of Spanish, and two divisions of British gun-boats, bombarded Fort Catalina at the southern end of the Bay of Bulls, while mortar and howitzer boats threw about 100 shells into French gunboats in the Guadalete river by El Puerto de Santa María.

On 24 November the mortar and howitzer boats threw several hundred shells into Santa Maria whilst Aetna, Devastation and Thunder, with part of the Spanish flotilla and the British gunboats drew the fire from Catalina. In 1847 the Admiralty awarded the then still surviving participants in action on 28 November the NGSM with the clasp "Boat Service 23 Nov."

At the beginning of December Aetna burst her large mortar, the fourth time she had done so during the siege. One of these events had resulted in the death of 13 of her crew, and the wounding of numerous others.

In November 1811 Commander Richard Kenah replaced Bowker. He sailed Aetna to the Baltic in 1813.

War of 1812
Aetna then sailed for North America. In April 1814 Aetna sailed to America to join the squadron of Vice-Admiral Sir Alexander Cochrane.

Potomac River expedition
Contrary winds meant they had to sweep for more than 50 miles over a period of five successive days, and lacking a pilot through Kettle-Bottoms, meant that it took ten days to reach the Fort.

On the evening of the 27th they began a bombardment of the fort that continued until the powder magazine exploded. When the British took possession the following morning they found that the Americans had retreated leaving 21 heavy guns and 6 field-pieces – all spiked. On the 29th the British accepted the surrender of the town of Alexandria and took possession of 21 seaworthy vessels which were loaded with merchandise and naval and ordnance stores. On 31 August  arrived with news that the Americans were mounting guns downstream to oppose the squadron's return, so the British started back without delay. Unfortunately Devastation ran aground, and the Americans tried to destroy her with three fire ships. The British, who launched their own boats, drove off the Americans and towed the fire-vessels to shore. The squadron spent a total of 23 days in the river. In 1847 the Admiralty awarded the then still surviving participants in the battle the NGSM with the clasp "The Potomac 17 Augt. 1814".

Battle of Baltimore 
On 12 September 1814 Erebus, Meteor, Aetna, and Devastation sailed up the Patapsco River in preparation for an attack on Baltimore, commencing their bombardment of Fort McHenry on the 13th, before being ordered to withdraw on the 14th.

On 14 October the fleet departed for Negril Bay, Jamaica, arriving on 5 November, to prepare for the attack on New Orleans. Commander Francis Fead commanded Aetna in 1815, having assumed command on 4 October 1814.

Gulf Coast 
At the end of 1814, Aetna took part in the Gulf Campaign. First, her crew participated in the Battle of Lake Borgne. It took the British vessels from 30 December to 9 January 1815 to work the forty miles up the Mississippi to the fort, by warping and hard towing to the Plaquesmines Bend, just below the fort. For most of January, Aetna was moored off the Mississippi; she moved to a new anchorage off Ship Island on 27 January 1815. On 9 February, Aetna was off Mobile Sound, and was ordered to send Lieutenant Knight and his Marine artillerymen to join the army on shore, who were preparing to besiege Fort Bowyer. The following day, the bomb vessels Meteor, and Hydra arrived. Aetna witnessed the capitulation of the fort and the raising of the Union Jack.

Aetna was to remain off Mobile until the end of March 1815. On 25 April, she embarked some refugee slaves for passage to the Caribbean. They had come from Negro Fort, which the British were evacuating. Once the former slaves had disembarked, Aetna embarked invalided servicemen whom she carried to Portsmouth.

Disposal
Returning from America, Aetna arrived back at Portsmouth on 19 July 1815, before sailing to Woolwich for disposal. The principal Officers and Commissioners of His Majesty's Navy offered the "Ætna bomb, of 368 tons", lying at Woolwich, for sale on 14 December. She sold there on 11 January 1816 for £1,850.

Mercantile service
Success reappeared in Lloyd's Register in 1816 with Martin, master, Morgan & Co., owner, and trade London–Jamaica. She had undergone a thorough repair in 1816.

On 26 November 1817 Success was at Deal, having arrived from the Thames on her way to Calcutta. On 28 February 1818 Success arrived off the Cape of Good Hope from London; she was bound for Calcutta. She arrived back at Gravesend on 254 January 1819.

On 30 December 1818 as Success was returning from Bengal she was off Pico Island in the Azores when the insurgent privateer schooner Buenos Ayres, of 18 guns and 100 men (mostly Britons and Americans), boarded Success. In the dusk they suspected that she was Spanish because of her high stern. The privateer's men inspected her papers carefully to insure that she was not Spanish sailing under a false flag. The privateer's Chief Mate informed Captain Martin that the privateer had been out nine months and had a successful cruise, having captured numerous vessels, including a major Spanish vessel and a Portuguese vessel coming from Bengal with Spanish goods on board.<ref>[https://hdl.handle.net/2027/uc1.c2735029?urlappend=%3Bseq=26 Lloyd's List (LL) 15 January 1819, №5357.]</ref>

FateLloyd's List published a letter from Les Sables-d'Olonne dated 16 August 1823, reporting that Success'', Martin, had wrecked while sailing between Oberon (Oléron) to Abbeveille. The crew had been saved.

Notes, citations, references

Notes

Citations

References

External links
 Naval History of Great Britain
 Ships of the Old Navy

Bomb vessels of the Royal Navy
War of 1812 ships of the United Kingdom